The Disciplines is a garage rock band from Oslo, Norway, led by singer Ken Stringfellow (The Posies, R.E.M. and Big Star).

Discography

Albums 
Smoking Kills (2009), Voices of Wonder (Norway/DK), Weekender (UK), 2Fer-PIAS(Spain), Second Motion (USA), S'Music (South America), Spark & Shine (Germany/A/CH) and V2 Records (Benelux)
Virgins of Menace (2011), Rock's My Ass Records www.rocksmyassrecords.com (France), SPARK & SHiNE (north america/germany/nl),Tin Robot (uk/ireland), Naked Man (spain/portugal) VOW (norway/dk), Other Tongues (nz/australia)

Singles 
'"Fate's a Strong Bitch (feat Lydia Lunch)"/"Urbane Problemer" (Kjøtt cover) 7" single
"Best Mistake"/"No Vacancy" 7" single
"Yours for the Taking" 7" single
"There's a Law" 7" single

References

External links
 Label website

Garage rock groups
Norwegian musical groups
Musical groups established in 2007
Musical quartets
Second Motion Records artists
V2 Records artists